Radio Televizija Panorama was a local broadcasting company based in Pljevlja, Montenegro. The programmes of Radio Panorama and TV Panorama could be heard and seen in the Pljevlja area.

They closed down in 2013, due to high debts for broadcasting.

Television stations in Montenegro
Radio stations in Montenegro
Defunct mass media in Montenegro